Craigmillar Park Church serves Edinburgh's Newington area, in Scotland. It is a congregation of the Church of Scotland. The church building dates from 1879 and the adjacent hall was added in 1899.

Building
Although the church is without tower or spire, the building is situated on the busy main north – south route stretching from east end of Princes Street through Newington towards Liberton. Craigmillar Park Church is adjacent to the Royal Blind School, where the minister is Chaplain. Within the garden is a memorial to people from the parish who gave their lives in the First World War.

History
The building was originally known as Mayfield Parish Church until the Mayfield Free Church (now known as Mayfield Salisbury) rejoined the Church of Scotland. To differentiate between the two churches, North and South were added to the congregation names.

The present congregation is the result of a voluntary union of the former Craigmillar Park and Mayfield South congregations in 1966. Worship is currently held in the Mayfield South Building, which adopted the name of the former Craigmillar Park Church. The aforementioned Craigmillar Park Church, originally a Free Church congregation, opened in 1899, before becoming Buchanan House, part of former St. Margaret's School, in 1976. Following the school's closure, it has now become the Iqra Academy (mosque). As of July 2010, there are 266 members of Craigmillar Park Church.

On June 11, 2019, the Rev. Alex McAspurren was inducted as minister of both Craigmillar Park Church and Reid Memorial Church, the two churches having been linked by the Presbytery of Edinburgh the previous year.

Organ
The church is fortunate in its organ and its organist. The organ – a three manual pipe organ dating originally from 1892 and well-maintained since then – is generally recognised to be one of the best church instruments in Edinburgh and the organist is an experienced and committed professional musician whose contribution to worship is deeply appreciated. In days of old, the organist would assist the Gallery Gang with their regular musical contributions to worship. The congregation uses Church Hymnary 4th edition, occasionally supplemented by songs and hymns from other resources.

See also
 Church of Scotland
 List of Church of Scotland parishes

References

External links
 
 Church of Scotland

Churches completed in 1879
Church of Scotland churches in Edinburgh
Listed churches in Edinburgh